Canyon Day (Western Apache: Yangongai) is a census-designated place (CDP) in Gila County, Arizona, United States, on the Fort Apache Indian Reservation. The population was 1,209 at the 2010 census.

Geography
Canyon Day is located in easternmost Gila County at  (33.787774, -110.023655). It is bordered to the east by Fort Apache in Navajo County. Arizona State Route 73 passes through Canyon Day, leading northeast  to Hondah or Indian Pine and northwest  to U.S. Route 60 near Carrizo.

The White River, a west-flowing tributary of the Salt River, forms the southern edge of the Canyon Day CDP.

Demographics

As of the census of 2000, there were 1,092 people, 271 households, and 227 families residing in the CDP. The racial makeup of the CDP was 98.5% Native American, 1.0% White, 0.2% from other races, and 0.3% from two or more races.  0.6% of the population were Hispanic or Latino of any race.

There were 271 households, out of which 51.7% had children under the age of 18 living with them, 46.1% were married couples living together, 31.7% had a female householder with no husband present, and 16.2% were non-families. 15.5% of all households were made up of individuals, and 2.2% had someone living alone who was 65 years of age or older.  The average household size was 4.0 and the average family size was 4.4.

In the CDP, the population was spread out, with 43.6% under the age of 18, 9.2% from 18 to 24, 26.1% from 25 to 44, 17.0% from 45 to 64, and 4.0% who were 65 years of age or older.  The median age was 23 years. For every 100 females, there were 92.9 males.  For every 100 females age 18 and over, there were 84.4 males.

The median income for a household in the CDP was $20,987, and the median income for a family was $22,633. Males had a median income of $25,469 versus $17,813 for females. The per capita income for the CDP was $6,940.  About 32.2% of families and 40.0% of the population were below the poverty line, including 46.5% of those under age 18 and 8.0% of those age 65 or over.

Transportation
The White Mountain Apache Tribe operates the Fort Apache Connection Transit, which provides local bus service.

References

Census-designated places in Gila County, Arizona
White Mountain Apache Tribe